Arsi University was established on 15 October 2014, in Asella city, Oromia, Ethiopia.

References

Universities and colleges in Oromia Region
Educational institutions established in 2014
2014 establishments in Ethiopia